Odakkuzhal Award is an Indian literary award given every year to writers for a particular outstanding work of him/her in Malayalam–language. The award was founded in 1969 by poet G. Sankara Kurup to commemorate the Jnanpith Award he had won.

Awardees

References

Indian literary awards
Awards established in 1969
Malayalam literary awards
Kerala awards
1969 establishments in Kerala